Jeffery T. Williams is an American ichthyologist. He is primarily interested in the systematics, taxonomy, and zoogeography of marine fishes. He is the retired Collections Manager in the Division of Fishes at the National Museum of Natural History of the Smithsonian Institution.

Education
B.S. Biology, Florida State University,1975
M.S. Biology, University of South Alabama 1979
Ph.D. Zoology, University of Florida, 1986

See also
:Category:Taxa named by Jeffrey T. Williams

References 

American ichthyologists
Living people
Year of birth missing (living people)